The 1931 Akron Zippers football team was an American football team that represented the University of Akron in the Ohio Athletic Conference during the 1931 college football season. In its fifth season under head coach Red Blair, the team compiled a 1–7 record (0–6 in conference) and was outscored by a total of 114 to 39. William Schmittgen was the team captain.

Schedule

References

Akron
Akron Zips football seasons
Akron Zippers football